Avolution is a global provider of Enterprise Architecture, Enterprise Modeling and Process Modeling software with offices based in Sydney, Singapore, London, Dubai, Washington Metropolitan Area and New Brunswick.  Avolution was spun-out from the University of Technology, Sydney in 2001.

The company's product, ABACUS, is a software package used for Enterprise Architecture (EA), Enterprise Modeling, Process Modeling and Roadmapping and supports over 100 frameworks and notations including TOGAF, ArchiMate, BPMN, UML, UPDM, ITIL, FEAF, Zachman and Frameworx.

The name ABACUS stands for the "Algorithm-Based Analysis, Communication and Understanding of Systems".

See also 
 Enterprise Architecture
 Enterprise Modeling
 Process Modeling
 Project Portfolio Management
 Service-Oriented Architecture

References

External links 
 
 YouTube channel
 The Open Group

Enterprise modelling
Software companies of Australia